Smoky River was a provincial electoral district in Alberta, Canada mandated to return a single member to the Legislative Assembly of Alberta using the first-past-the-post method of voting from 1971 to 1993.

History

Boundary history
The riding was created from the western part of Grouard and the eastern part of Grande Prairie in 1971. It included the communities of Valleyview and Falher. The Smoky River, which it was named after, formed most of its western boundary.

For the 1986 election, the western boundary of Smoky River was extended westward to the city limits of Grande Prairie, now including the communities of Sexsmith and Clairmont. It was abolished in 1993, with most of the riding (including Valleyview and Sexsmith) becoming part of Grande Prairie-Smoky and the northern part (including Falher) going to Dunvegan.

Representation history

Smoky River was held by the Progressive Conservatives for the duration of its existence, and for all but one term, by Marvin Moore. Narrowly elected over his NDP rival when the district was created in 1971, he received consistent support thereafter. He served in several cabinet positions under Peter Lougheed and Don Getty.

When Moore decided to retire, the district was won by PC Walter Paszkowski in 1989. Smoky River was abolished at the end of his first term, but he would go on to serve as MLA for its successor riding, Grande Prairie-Smoky, and serve in the cabinet of Ralph Klein.

Election results

1970s

|}

|}

|}

1980s

|}

|}

|}

See also
List of Alberta provincial electoral districts

References

Further reading

External links
Elections Alberta
The Legislative Assembly of Alberta

Former provincial electoral districts of Alberta